Regenerative agriculture is a conservation and rehabilitation approach to food and farming systems. It focuses on topsoil regeneration, increasing biodiversity, improving the water cycle, enhancing ecosystem services, supporting biosequestration, increasing resilience to climate change, and strengthening the health and vitality of farm soil.

Regenerative agriculture is not a specific practice itself. Rather, proponents of regenerative agriculture use a variety of sustainable agriculture techniques in combination. Practices include recycling as much farm waste as possible and adding composted material from sources outside the farm. Regenerative agriculture on small farms and gardens is often based on philosophies like permaculture, agroecology, agroforestry, restoration ecology, keyline design, and holistic management. Large farms are also increasingly adopting such techniques, and often use "no-till" and/or "reduced till" practices.

As soil health improves, input requirements may decrease, and crop yields may increase as soils are more resilient against extreme weather and harbor fewer pests and pathogens.

Regenerative agriculture mitigates climate change through carbon dioxide removal, i.e. it draws carbon from the atmosphere and sequesters it.

History

Origins 
Regenerative agriculture is based on various agricultural and ecological practices, with a particular emphasis on minimal soil disturbance and the practice of composting. Maynard Murray had similar ideas, using sea minerals. His work led to innovations in no-till practices, such as slash and mulch in tropical regions. Sheet mulching is a regenerative agriculture practice that smothers weeds and adds nutrients to the soil below.

In the early 1980s, the Rodale Institute began using the term ‘regenerative agriculture’. Rodale Publishing formed the Regenerative Agriculture Association, which began publishing regenerative agriculture books in 1987 and 1988.

However, the institute stopped using the term in the late 1980s, and it only appeared sporadically (in 2005 and 2008), until they released a white paper in 2014, titled "Regenerative Organic Agriculture and Climate Change". The paper's summary states, "we could sequester more than 100% of current annual CO2 emissions with a switch to common and inexpensive organic management practices, which we term 'regenerative organic agriculture.'" The paper described agricultural practices, like crop rotation, compost application, and reduced tillage, that are similar to organic agriculture methods. 

In 2002, Storm Cunningham documented the beginning of what he called "restorative agriculture" in his first book, The Restoration Economy. Cunningham defined restorative agriculture as a technique that rebuilds the quantity and quality of topsoil, while also restoring local biodiversity (especially native pollinators) and watershed function. Restorative agriculture was one of the eight sectors of restorative development industries/disciplines in The Restoration Economy.

Recent developments (since 2010) 
Indigenous cultures have long been privy to the innate knowledge of many of regenerative agriculture's techniques. These practices have existed for centuries, but the term itself has only been around for some decades, and as of late, has increasingly showed up in academic research since the early to mid 2010s in the fields of environmental science, plant science, and ecology. As the term expands in use, many books have been published on the topic and several organizations started to promote regenerative agriculture techniques. Allan Savory gave a TED talk on fighting and reversing climate change in 2013. He also launched The Savory Institute, which educates ranchers on methods of holistic land management. Abe Collins created LandStream to monitor ecosystem performance in regenerative agriculture farms. Eric Toensmeier had a book published on the subject in 2016. However, researchers at Wageningen University in the Netherlands found there to be no consistent definition of what people referencing "regenerative agriculture" meant. They also found that most of the work around this topic were instead the authors' attempt at shaping what regenerative agriculture meant.

Founded in 2013, 501(c)3 non-profit Kiss the Ground was one of the first to publicize the term to a broader audience. Today the group runs a series of media, farmland, education, and policy programs to raise awareness around soil health and support farmers who aim to transition from conventional to regenerative land management practices. The film Kiss the Ground, executive produced by Julian Lennon and Gisele Bündchen and narrated by Woody Harrelson, was released in 2020. Soil Health Academy and Farmers Footprint are among other educational platforms based in the United States.

Not all regenerative systems emphasize ruminants. In 2017, Reginaldo Haslett Marroquin published "In the Shadow of Green Man" with Per Andreeason, which detailed Haslett Marroquin's early life as a campesino in Guatemala and how these experiences led him to develop regenerative poultry agroforestry systems that are now being practiced and expanding in the United States and elsewhere. 

Several large corporations have also announced regenerative agriculture initiatives in the last few years. In 2019, General Mills announced an effort to promote regenerative agriculture practices in their supply chain. The farming practices have received criticism from academic and government experiments on sustainability in farming. In particular, Gunsmoke Farm partnered with General Mills to transition to regenerative agriculture practices and become a teaching hub for others. Experts from the area have expressed concerns about the farm now doing more harm than good, with agronomist Ruth Beck stating that "Environmental marketing got ahead of what farmers can actually do".

In February 2021, the regenerative agriculture market gained traction after Joe Biden's Secretary of Agriculture Tom Vilsack made reference to it during his Senate Confirmation hearing. The Biden Administration wants to utilize $30 billion from the USDA's Commodity Credit Corporations to incentive farmers to adopt sustainable practices. Vilsack stated in the hearing, "It is a great tool for us to create the kind of structure that will inform future farm bills about what will encourage carbon sequestration, what will encourage precision agriculture, what will encourage soil health and regenerative agricultural practices." After this announcement from the Biden Administration, several national and international corporations announced initiatives into regenerative agriculture. During the House of Representatives Committee on Agriculture's first hearing on climate change, Gabe Brown, a proponent of regenerative agriculture, testified about the role of regenerative agriculture in both the economics and sustainability of farming.

In 2021, PepsiCo announced that by 2030 they will work with the farmers in their supply chain to establish regenerative agriculture practices across their approximately 7 million acres. In 2021, Unilever announced an extensive implementation plan to incorporate regenerative agriculture throughout their supply chain. VF Corporation, the parent company of The North Face, Timberland, and Vans, announced in 2021 a partnership with Terra Genesis International to create a supply chain for their rubber that comes from sources utilizing regenerative agriculture. Nestle announced in 2021 a $1.8 billion investment in regenerative agriculture in an effort to reduce their emissions by 95%.

A recent trend of small-scale farmers have been taking the lead in adopting regenerative agriculture principles.

Several days before the opening of 2022 United Nations Climate Change Conference a report was published, sponsored by some of the biggest agricultural companies. The report was produced by Sustainable Markets Initiative an organisation of companies, trying to become climate friendly, established by the king Charles III. According to the report, Regenerative agriculture is already implemented on 15% of all cropland. Despite it the rate of transition is "far too slow" and must be tripled by the year 2030 for preventing the global temperature to pass the threshold of 1.5 degrees above preindustrial level. Agricultural practices must immediately change for not "destroying the planet". One of the authors emphasised that “The interconnection between human health and planetary health is more evident than ever before.” The authors propose a set of measures for accelerating the transition, like creating metrics for measuring how much the farming is sustainable and pay the farmers who will change their farming mode to more sustainable. They want to present their propositions in the summit.

Principles 
There are several individuals, groups, and organizations that have attempted to define what the principles of regenerative agriculture are. In their review of the existing literature on regenerative agriculture, researchers at Wageningen University created a database of 279 published research articles on regenerative agriculture. Their analysis of this database found that people using the term regenerative agriculture were using different principles to guide regenerative agriculture efforts. The 4 most consistent principles were found to be, 1) enhancing and improving soil health, 2) optimization of resource management, 3) alleviation of climate change, and 4) improvement of water quality and availability.

Notable definitions of principles 
The organization The Carbon Underground created a set of principles that have been signed on to by a number of non-profits and corporations including Ben & Jerry's, Annie's, and the Rodale Institute, which was one of the first organization to use the term "Regenerative Agriculture". The principles they've outlined include building soil health and fertility, increase water percolation and retention, increasing biodiversity and ecosystem health, and reducing carbon emissions and current atmospheric CO2 levels.

The group Terra Genesis International based in Thailand, and VF Corporation's partner in their regenerative agriculture initiative, created a set of 4 principles, which include:

 "Progressively improve whole agroecosystems (soil, water and biodiversity)"
 "Create context-specific designs and make holistic decisions that express the essence of each farm"
 "Ensure and develop just and reciprocal relationships amongst all stakeholders"
 "Continually grow and evolve individuals, farms, and communities to express their innate potential"

Instead of focusing on the specifics of food production technologies, human ecologist Philip Loring suggests a food system-level focus on regeneration, arguing that it is the combination of flexibility and diversity in our food systems that supports regenerative ecological practices. Loring argues that, depending on the relative flexibility of people in the food system with respect to the foods they eat and the overall diversity of foods being produced and harvested, food systems can fall into one of four general patterns:
 Regenerative (high diversity, high flexibility), where ecosystems are able to recycle and replenish used energy to usable forms, such as found in many Indigenous food systems
 Degenerative (High diversity, low flexibility), where people fixate on specific resources and only switch to alternatives once the preferred commodity is exhausted, such as fishing down the food web.
 Coerced (low diversity, low flexibility), where people subsidize prized resources at the expense of the surrounding ecosystem, such as in the Maine Lobster fishery
 Impoverished (low diversity, high flexibility), where people are willing to be flexible but, because they are living in degraded ecosystems and possibly a povery trap, cannot allow ecosystems and resources to regenerate. 

Loring's typology is based on a principle he calls the Conservation of Change, which states that change must always happen somewhere in ecosystems, and derives from the Second Law of Thermodynamics and Barry Commoner's premise in that, in ecosystems, "there is no free lunch".

Practices 
Practices and principles used in regenerative farming include:

 Alternative food networks (AFNs), commonly defined by attributes such as the spatial proximity between farmers and consumers.
Aquaculture
Ecological aquaculture
Regenerative ocean farming
Agroecology
Agroforestry
 Biochar/terra preta
 Use of Biostimulants
 Borders planted for pollinator habitat and other beneficial insects
 Compost, compost tea, animal manures and thermal compost
Conservation farming, no-till farming, minimum tillage, and pasture cropping
 Cover crops & multi-species cover crops
Home gardens, to mitigate the adverse effect of global food shocks and food price volatilities, also as a strategy to enhance household food security and nutrition
Regrowing vegetables, for recycling and sustainable living
Keyline subsoiling
 Livestock: well-managed grazing, animal integration and holistically managed grazing
 Grass-fed cattle 
 Natural sequence farming
 Organic annual cropping and crop rotations
 Perennial crops
 Ponding banks, to prevent soil erosion also known as grading banks and, in parts of Australia, commonly known as Purvis banks, after Ron Purvis Jr of Woodgreen Station in the Northern Territory
 Permaculture design
 Polyculture and full-time succession planting of multiple and inter-crop plantings
 Silvopasture
Soil food web

Environmental impacts

Carbon sequestration 

Conventional agricultural practices such as plowing and tilling release carbon dioxide (CO2) from the soil by exposing organic matter to the surface and thus promoting oxidation. It is estimated that roughly a third of the total anthropogenic inputs of CO2 to the atmosphere since the industrial revolution have come from the degradation of soil organic matter and that 30–75% of global soil organic matter has been lost since the advent of tillage-based farming. Greenhouse gas (GHG) emissions associated with conventional soil and cropping activities represent 13.7% of anthropogenic emissions, or 1.86 Pg-C y−1. The raising of ruminant livestock also contributes GHGs, representing 11.6% of anthropogenic emissions, or 1.58 Pg-C y−1. Furthermore, runoff and siltation of water bodies associated with conventional farming practices promote eutrophication and emissions of methane.

Regenerative agriculture practices such as no-till farming, rotational grazing, mixed crop rotation, cover cropping, and the application of compost and manure have the potential to reverse this trend. No-till farming reintroduces carbon back into the soil as crop residues are pressed down when seeding. Some studies suggest that adoption of no-till practices could triple soil carbon content in less than 15 years. Additionally, 1 Pg-C y−1, representing roughly a fourth to a third of anthropogenic CO2 emissions, may be sequestered by converting croplands to no-till systems on a global scale.

Regenerative grazing management, particularly adaptive multipaddock (AMP) grazing, has been shown to reduce soil degradation compared to continuous grazing and thus has the potential to mitigate carbon emissions from soil. Crop rotation and maintenance of permanent cover crops help to reduce soil erosion as well, and in conjunction with AMP grazing, may result in net carbon sequestration. One study suggests that total conversion of livestock raising to AMP grazing practices coupled with conservation cropping has the potential to convert North American farmlands to a carbon sink, sequestering approximately 1.2 Pg-C y−1. Over the next 25–50 years, the cumulative sequestration potential is 30-60 Pg-C. Additions of organic manures and compost further build soil organic carbon, thus contributing to carbon sequestration potential.

A research made by the Rodale institute suggests that a worldwide transition to regenerative agriculture can soak more than 100% of the CO2 currently emitted by people.

Nutrient cycling 
Soil organic matter is the primary sink of nutrients necessary for plant growth such as nitrogen, phosphorus, zinc, sulfur, and molybdenum. Conventional tillage-based farming promotes rapid erosion and degradation of soil organic matter, depleting soil of plant nutrients and thus lowering productivity. Tillage, in conjunction with additions of inorganic fertilizer, also destroys soil microbial communities, reducing production of organic nutrients in soil. Practices that restore organic matter may be used to increase the total nutrient load of soil. For example, regenerative management of ruminant livestock in mixed-crop and grazing agroecosystems has been shown to improve soil nutrient cycling by encouraging the consumption and decomposition of residual crop biomass and promoting the recovery of nitrogen-fixing plant species. Regenerative crop management practices, namely the use of crop rotation to ensure permanent ground cover, have the potential to increase soil fertility and nutrient levels if nitrogen-fixing crops are included in the rotation. Crop rotation and rotational grazing also allow the nutrients in soil to recover between growing and grazing periods, thus further enhancing overall nutrient load and cycling.

Biodiversity 
Conventional agricultural practices are generally understood to simplify agroecosystems through introduction of monocultures and eradication of diversity in soil microbial communities through chemical fertilization. In natural ecosystems, biodiversity serves to regulate ecosystem function internally, but under conventional agricultural systems, such control is lost and requires increasing levels of external, anthropogenic input. By contrast, regenerative agriculture practices including polycultures, mixed crop rotation, cover cropping, organic soil management, and low- or no-tillage methods have been shown to increase overall species diversity while reducing pest population densities. Additionally, practices that favor organic over inorganic inputs aid in restoring below-ground biodiversity by enhancing the functioning of soil microbial communities. A survey of organic and conventional farms in Europe found that on the whole, species across several taxa were higher in richness and/or abundance on organic farms compared to conventional ones, especially species whose populations have been demonstrably harmed as a direct result of conventional agriculture.

AMP grazing can help improve biodiversity since increased soil organic carbon stocks also promotes a diversity of soil microbial communities. Implementation of AMP in North American prairies, for example, has been correlated with an increase in forage productivity and the restoration of plant species that had previously been decimated by continuous grazing practices. Furthermore, studies of arid and semiarid regions of the world where regenerative grazing has been practiced for a long time following prior periods of continuous grazing have shown a recovery of biodiversity, grass species, and pollinator species. Furthermore, crop diversification ensures that the agroecosystem remains productive when facing lower levels of soil fertility. Higher levels of plant diversity led to increases in numerous factors that contribute to soil fertility, such as soil N, K, Ca, Mg, and C, in CEC and in soil pH.

Criticism 
Some members of the scientific community have criticized as exaggerated and unsupported by evidence some of the claims made by proponents of regenerative agriculture.

One of the prominent proponents of regenerative agriculture, Allan Savory, claimed in his TED talk that holistic grazing could reduce carbon-dioxide levels to pre-industrial levels in a span of 40 years. According to Skeptical Science: "it is not possible to increase productivity, increase numbers of cattle and store carbon using any grazing strategy, never-mind Holistic Management [...] Long term studies on the effect of grazing on soil carbon storage have been done before, and the results are not promising.[...] Because of the complex nature of carbon storage in soils, increasing global temperature, risk of desertification and methane emissions from livestock, it is unlikely that Holistic Management, or any management technique, can reverse climate change."

According to a 2016 study published by the Swedish University of Agricultural Sciences, the actual rate at which improved grazing management could contribute to carbon sequestration is seven times lower than the claims made by Savory. The study concludes that holistic management cannot reverse climate change. A study by the Food and Climate Research Network in 2017 concluded that Savory's claims about carbon sequestration are "unrealistic" and very different from those issued by peer-reviewed studies.

Tim Searchinger and Janet Ranganathan have expressed concerns about emphasis upon "Practices That Increase Soil Carbon at the Field Level" because "overestimating potential soil carbon gains could undermine efforts to advance effective climate mitigation in the agriculture sector." Instead Tim Searchinger and Janet Ranganathan say, "preserving the huge, existing reservoirs of vegetative and soil carbon in the world’s remaining forests and woody savannas by boosting productivity on existing agricultural land (a land sparing strategy) is the largest, potential climate mitigation prize of regenerative and other agricultural practices. Realizing these benefits requires implementing practices in ways that boost productivity and then linking those gains to governance and finance to protect natural ecosystems. In short, produce, protect and prosper are the most important opportunities for agriculture."

See also
Agroecological restoration
Agroecology
Agroforestry
Biointensive agriculture
Carbon farming
Farmer-managed natural regeneration
Korean natural farming
Permaculture
Regenerative design

External links 

 Regenerative Success
 Can more sustainable agricultural practices be utilized
 Learning from Nature 

"Regenerative Agriculture". Regeneration.org. 2021.
 VicNoTill at Horsham, Victoria. No-Till Regenerative Farming Systems Australia.

References

Agroecology
Organic farming
Permaculture
Permaculture concepts
Climate change and agriculture